Samahni is a small town and tehsil in Bhimber District of Azad Kashmir, Pakistan, located at a distance of  by road northeast of Bhimber.  It lies in the Samahni Valley, an area noted for its production of medicinal plants. In 2017 it had a population of 1,44,756 people.

Landmarks
Samahni contains the Decree College library, and a cricket ground.

Union Councils
Samahni
Dab Sandoha
Manana Sarsla
Jandala
Tonewn
Khambah
Poona
Chowki
Bandala Baghsar  ( only 9 Union council in Tehsil Samahni)

References

Populated places in Bhimber District

Tehsils of Bhimber District